Mesera is a genus of moths in the family Lasiocampidae. The genus was erected by Francis Walker in 1855.

Species
Mesera arpi Schaus, 1896
Mesera crassipuncta Draudt, 1927
Mesera rimicola Draudt, 1927
Mesera tristis Walker, 1855

External links

Lasiocampidae